The Little Bull-Calf is an English Romani fairy tale collected by Joseph Jacobs in More English Fairy Tales.

Marian Roalfe Cox, in her pioneering study of Cinderella, identified it as a "hero" type, featuring a male hero instead of the usual heroine.

Source
The tale was collected by Irish linguist John Sampson from a Romani man named Gray, who named his tale De Little Bull-Calf, and published in the Journal of the Gypsy Lore Society. Francis Hindes Groome republished the tale and sourced it from an English-Romani teller.

In another article from the Journal of the Gypsy Lore Society, T. W. Thompson indicated that Sampson's informant was a man named Johnny Gray, from a Romani family surnamed Gray.

Synopsis

A little boy was given a little bull-calf by his father.  His father died, and his mother remarried.  His stepfather was cruel to him and threatened to kill the calf.  An old man advised the boy to run away, and he did.  He begged for some bread, which he shared with the calf.  Later, he begged for some cheese, which he would have shared, but the calf refused.  It told the boy it would go into the wild and kill all the creatures it finds, except a dragon, which will kill it.  It told the boy to climb a tree, and once it was dead, to skin it and take its bladder, which would make anything it struck drop dead.  With it, he was to kill the dragon.

It happened as the calf said.  Monkeys climbed the tree after him, and the boy squeezed the cheese, claiming it was flint; when they saw the whey, they retreated.  The boy set out to find the dragon and kill it.  He found a princess who had been staked out for the dragon.  He killed it, though it bit off his forefinger.  He said he must leave her, but first he cut out the dragon's tongue and the princess gave him a diamond ring.  The princess told her father, who asked for him to come, and many gentlemen cut off their forefingers and brought diamond rings and the tongues of all kinds of beasts, but none were the dragon's tongue or the princess's ring.

The boy came, but the king turned him away as a beggar, though the princess knew he was like the boy.  Somewhat later, he came back, better dressed, and the princess insisted on speaking with him.  He produced the ring and the tongue and married the princess. And they lived happily ever after.

Analysis

Tale type 
In his 1987 guide to folktales, folklorist D. L. Ashliman classified the tale, according to the international Aarne-Thompson Index, as type AaTh 511A, "The Little Red Ox". In a later work, Ashliman classified the tale as both AaTh 511A, and type AaTh 300, "The Dragon-Slayer".

English folklorist Katherine Mary Briggs, in her Dictionary of British Folk-Tales, listed the tale as belonging to tale type ATU 300, "The Dragon-Slayer", and type AaTh 511A, "The Little Red Ox".

Folklorist Marian Roalfe Cox, in her work Cinderella: Three Hundred and Forty-Five Variants of Cinderella, Catskin and, Cap O' Rushes, listed the tale as a Hero Tale belonging to the Cinderella Cycle.

American folklorist Stith Thompson noted the similarity of type AaTh 511A with type ATU 511, "One-Eye, Two-Eyes, Three-Eyes", in that the hero(ine) is helped by a bovine animal (in type 511A, sometimes replaced by a horse), whose body parts still help the hero(ine) after its death.

Origins and distribution 
Thompson supposed that the tale type originated from Oriental tradition, and variants exist across Europe, in India, and in North and Central Africa.

American folklorist Leonard W. Roberts reported in a 1955 publication that at least 50 variants of The Little Red Bull (hero helped by a bull) were recorded from Ireland until then. In another work, Roberts stated he collected 6 American tales from Eastern Kentucky, and reported tales from Nova Scotia, the Ozarks of Missouri and North Carolina.

Motifs 
Jacobs noted the dragon slaying theme was in common with Perseus and Andromeda myths, and that the trick with the cheese is also common in fairy tales.

According to Norwegian folklorist Reidar Thoralf Christiansen's 1950 article, Swedish scholar Anna Birgitta Rooth, in her work on Cinderella, separated five redactions of the cycle; the fifth redaction, which she termed "C", features a boy and a helpful animal. Christensen, in the same article, argued for a "less wide circulation" of this redaction, but noted some "constant" elements: the title, "referring always to the bull", and the first part, "up to the killing of the helpful bull". He recognized a wide variety in the second part of the tale, but, in Irish tradition, it continues as "The Dragon-slayer".

Publications
The tale was also included within The Red King and the Witch: Gypsy Folk and Fairy Tales by Ruth Manning-Sanders and A Book of British Fairy Tales by Alan Garner.

Adaptations
Author Francis Meredith Pilkington published an homonymous tale in her book Shamrock and Spear, and sourced it from Ireland. In her tale, the hero is named Billy Beg, and he works in a king's stables. One day, the king's wife, the queen, sees the bull and wishes to have some soup made from the bull. Billy Beg escapes with the bull to the woods, and they live there, helped by the bull's magic, detachable horn that provides both with food. The bull still fights a dragon and dies, and Billy uses its bladder to fashion a magic weapon to kill the dragon. Later, Billy faces another danger: a giant man with an axe. With the help with a magic stick, obtained from the bull's other horn, Billy turns it into a sword, kills the giant and saves the princess. He then escapes on his horse and leaves a shoe behind, which serves to identify him as the princess's true saviour.

See also 
 One-Eye, Two-Eyes, and Three-Eyes (ATU 511)
 The Horse Lurja

References

Little Bull-Calf
Romani fairy tales
Romani in England
Fictional cattle
Child characters in fairy tales
Dragons in popular culture
ATU 500-559
ATU 300-399
Joseph Jacobs